Swalcliffe Park School is a specialist residential and day school in Oxfordshire, England for boys aged 11–19 who have needs arising from their Autistic Spectrum conditions.

In day and residential settings, the school emphasises the development of students' communication, independence, self-management and personalised achievement. It has received three consecutive 'Outstanding' Ofsted ratings, in 2008, 2012 and 2015. Many pupils have additional needs associated with other diagnoses; e.g. ADHD, Dyslexia, Dyspraxia or Specific Language Impairment.

Swalcliffe Park School is run by the Swalcliffe Park School Trust, a registered charity. It is housed in Swalcliffe Park, a Grade II listed former stately home originally built in the 16th century and remodelled in the 18th century.

References

External links
 

Boarding schools in Oxfordshire
Boys' schools in Oxfordshire
Educational institutions established in 1965
Schools for people on the autistic spectrum
Special schools in Oxfordshire
Private schools in Oxfordshire
1965 establishments in England
Autism-related organisations in the United Kingdom